Philippe Hirschhorn (11 June 1946, Riga – 26 November 1996, Brussels) was a violinist. He won the Queen Elisabeth Music Competition in 1967. Born in Riga, Latvia, he first studied at Darsin music school in Riga with Prof. Waldemar Sturestep, later he studied with prof Michael Waiman at the Conservatoire of St. Petersburg (Then still called Leningrad Conservatory). He played concerts all over the world (Europe, America and Japan) with the most prestigious orchestras conducted by amongst others Herbert von Karajan, Uri Segal, Eugene Ormandy, Yury Temirkanov, Gennady Rozhdestvensky, Gary Bertini, Ronald Zollman. He played together with Roger Woodward, Elisabeth Leonskaya, Martha Argerich, James Tocco, Alexandre Rabinovitch-Barakovsky, Frederic Meinders, Hans Mannes, Brigitte Engerer etc. The rare recordings that exist of him playing are examples of his technical and musical abilities. He was the teacher of many excellent violinists who dedicated their working life to performing and teaching, among others Philippe Graffin, David Grimal, Cornelia Angerhofer, Janine Jansen, Yoris Jarzynski, Marie-Pierre Vendôme and many others.

External links

 
 New York Times review of the documentary The Winners
 Philippe Hirshhorn's memorial site 

1946 births
1996 deaths
Latvian classical violinists
Prize-winners of the Queen Elisabeth Competition
Musicians from Riga
20th-century classical violinists
20th-century male musicians
Deaths from brain cancer in Belgium
Male classical violinists